The ancient Egyptian Arms-in-embrace hieroglyph, Gardiner sign listed no. D32 is a portrayal of the embracing human arms. The hieroglyph is in the large Gardiner sign list category of Parts of the Human Body.

Multiple types of additional hieroglyphs are inserted between the arms, forming Gardiner unlisted varieties.

Usage
The Egyptian language arms-in-embrace hieroglyph has multiple uses. It is a determinative for 'hugging', inq, "to surround", and ḥpt, "to hug".

As an ideogram it has two meanings for s(kh)n. Both uses are verb uses. 'Sekhen-1', with multiple spellings, and various secondary determinatives, O34:Aa1:N35-D32-G43-.-O34:Aa1*W24-D32:W24 (sḫn), meaning: to fold in the arms, to embrace, to contain, to hold. The second meaning, (sḫn), spellings of, D32:W24-Aa29-.-D32:W24-.-O34:Aa1:N35-D32:W24 is used to mean: to happen, a happening, event, occurrence. (verb or noun).

Rosetta Stone, Egyptian hieroglyph section text

<div>In the 196 BC Rosetta Stone, a "(May there be): Good Forture"-(i.e. "Good Luck") phrase is a segue to the 8 listed rewards given to the honoring of Ptolemy V, one, by erecting his Decree of Memphis (Ptolemy V) in the temple courtyard. The phrase is three-part: ḥ'–s(kh)n–nfr, "And a happening good ! – [may there be]". V28:D36-.-D32:W24-Aa29-.-F35</div>

Gallery

See also
Gardiner's Sign List#O. Parts of the Human Body
List of Egyptian hieroglyphs

References
Citations

Bibliography
Budge, 1978, (1920).  An Egyptian Hieroglyphic Dictionary, E.A.Wallace Budge, (Dover Publications), c 1978, (c 1920), Dover edition, 1978. (In two volumes, 1314 pp, and cliv-(154) pp.) (softcover)
Budge, 1989, (1929).  The Rosetta Stone,'' E.A.Wallace Budge, (Dover Publications), c 1929, Dover edition(unabridged), 1989. (softcover)

Egyptian hieroglyphs: parts of the human body